National Highway 1 or National Road No.1 (10001) is one of the national highways of Cambodia. In Phnom Penh the road converges with National Highway 2 near Monivong Bridge  and National Highway 5 at Stat Chas Circle Garden, near the French Embassy.

History
Originally constructed during French colonial times, National Highway 1 is an important link from Phnom Penh to Ho Chi Minh City, formerly Saigon. The road was partly destroyed by carpet bombing by the US in the early 1970s. In 1981, Cambodia opened a newly repaired section of National Highway 1 to the Vietnamese border.

In April 2015, Tsubasa Bridge (also known as the Neak Loeung Bridge), a 2.2 km cable-stayed bridge with a single carriageway road, was opened replacing the ferry crossing service which was required to cross the Mekong River on National Road 1. It remains the longest bridge across the Mekong River in Cambodia. The bridge was built with assistance from the Japanese government totaling approximately $127 million US dollars.

Route
The NH 1 starts in Phnom Penh, the capital of Cambodia, where it joins the National Highway 5 at Stat Chas Circle Garden, near the French Embassy. In the city it crosses National Highway 2, which leads south. The road crosses the Bassac River via a double bridge. There is a three-lane section here, the rest of the route is single-lane. The NH 1 then runs southeast and parallels the Mekong. At Neak Loeung it crosses the Mekong over the Tsubasa Bridge into Prey Veng Province.

The second part goes through the plains of southeastern Cambodia. The route is mostly lined with smaller villages, with the exception of the small town of Svay Rieng. The road ends at the Border Check Point in Bavel, Svay Rieng Province, and on the Vietnamese side, it continues as the QL22 highway to Ho Chi Minh City.

Images

References

AH1
Roads in Cambodia
Transport in Phnom Penh
Buildings and structures in Prey Veng province
Svay Rieng province